Thomas George Southwell, 1st Viscount Southwell (4 May 1721 – 29 August 1780), styled The Honourable from birth until 1766, was an Irish politician and freemason.

Background
He was the oldest son of Thomas Southwell, 2nd Baron Southwell and his wife Mary Coke, eldest daughter of Thomas Coke. Southwell was educated at Lincoln's Inn and went then to Christ Church, Oxford. He was commissioned an ensign in the 2nd Regiment of Foot Guards on 1 May 1738, retiring from the Army in November 1741. Between 1753 and 1757, Southwell was Grandmaster of the Grand Lodge of Ireland.

Career
In 1747, Southwell entered the Irish House of Commons for Enniscorthy, sitting for it until 1761. Subsequently, he was returned for Limerick County, the same constituency his father and his uncle Henry Southwell had represented before, until 1766, when he succeeded his father as baron. Three years later, Southwell delivered his maiden speech in the Irish House of Lords. He was appointed Constable of Limerick Castle in 1750 and Governor of County Limerick in 1762, posts he held until his death in 1780. He was made High Sheriff of County Limerick for 1759. In 1776, Southwell was elevated to the title Viscount Southwell, of Castle Mattress, in the County of Limerick.

Family
On 18 June 1741, he married Margaret Hamilton, daughter of Arthur Cecil Hamilton of Castle Hamilton, Killeshandra, Co. Cavan and had by her three sons, Thomas (died young), Thomas Southwell, 2nd Viscount Southwell, and Robert, and a daughter, Lucia.

Southwell had another daughter, Meliora, named after her paternal great-grandmother. The identity of this daughter's mother is not clear.  Southwell recognised her as his daughter and, being her natural father, he was granted guardianship of her by the Court of Chancery of Great Britain. On 19 December 1758, Meliora married, by licence from the Archbishop of Canterbury, Joseph Otway, at St James's Church, Piccadilly. As a minor, Southwell had to give his permission for the marriage to proceed. The marriage was witnessed by Southwell, his son, Thomas, and his daughter Lucia.

Southwell died, aged 59 and was buried at Rathkeale. He was succeeded in his titles by his eldest surviving son, Thomas, while his younger son, Robert, also sat in the Parliament of Ireland.

References

1721 births
1788 deaths
Alumni of Christ Church, Oxford
Coldstream Guards officers
Members of Lincoln's Inn
Irish MPs 1727–1760
Irish MPs 1761–1768
Viscounts in the Peerage of Ireland
Politicians from County Limerick
High Sheriffs of County Limerick
Members of the Parliament of Ireland (pre-1801) for County Wexford constituencies
Members of the Parliament of Ireland (pre-1801) for County Limerick constituencies